"Skin" is a song by British singer and songwriter Rag'n'Bone Man. The song was released as a digital download on 26 January 2017 through Columbia Records as the third single from his debut studio album Human (2017). The song was written by Rory Graham (Rag'n'Bone Man), Jonny Coffer, Jamie Scott, Mike Needle, and Dan Bryer.

Background and conception
The song's inspiration came from Graham when he was watching a Game of Thrones episode involving the relationship between Jon Snow and Ygritte.

Music video 
On 25 March 2017, the music video was uploaded to the Rag'n'Bone Man Vevo channel. It was directed by Greg Davenport. It features a young boy walking through an abandoned village, seeking shelter.

Track listing

Charts

Weekly charts

Year-end charts

Certifications

Release history

References

2016 songs
2017 singles
Rag'n'Bone Man songs
Songs written by Jamie Scott
Songs written by Jonny Coffer
Songs written by Rag'n'Bone Man
Songs written by Dan Bryer
Songs written by Mike Needle